Defending champion Boris Becker defeated Stefan Edberg in a rematch of the previous year's final, 3–6, 6–4, 1–6, 6–2, 6–2 to win the singles tennis title at the 1991 Stockholm Open.

Seeds

Draw

Finals

Top half

Section 1

Section 2

Section 3

Section 4

External links
 1991 Stockholm Open draw

Singles